SpeedTax is a sales tax automation SaaS product. As a software as a service product, it allows businesses to automate the core elements of sales tax compliance: research, calculation, collection, reporting, filing and remittance of sales tax.. SpeedTax also provides management tools to enable snapshot views of reporting, treasury management and audit responsiveness.
SpeedTax automates the management of returns filing – the review and approval process, submissions of returns, and remittances. SpeedTax provides automatically prepared, signature-ready tax forms in interactive PDF format.

SpeedTax Integrations
The SpeedTax SaaS sales tax management service integrates with numerous accounting software applications including Sage MAS 90 ERP, Sage MAS 200 ERP, Sage Accpac ERP, Microsoft Dynamics GP, and Intuit's Quickbooks Pro, Premier and Enterprise Editions..

SpeedTax Software Developer Kit (SDK)
In addition to existing ERP integrations, SpeedTax offers software development kits (SDK) available for integration into eCommerce, POS and custom ERP applications. The SpeedTax SDK is a set of tools, code samples, documentation, and libraries that developers can use to connect any financial, e-commerce, point-of-sale, or custom-built application to the SpeedTax Web-services API to get accurate, on-demand sales tax calculations. The SpeedTax calculation service eliminates the need to look up or maintain sales tax rates, jurisdiction boundaries, and taxability, and online tools are provided to access reports and manage unique variables like product taxability and nexus. For a comprehensive sales tax automation and management package, the SpeedTax Plus service fully automates sales tax returns, filing and remittance. SpeedTax Pro, designed for tax professionals, features an administrative dashboard that allows them to manage and review sales tax compliance for multiple clients.

Supported Environments
The SpeedTax service can be used by any SOAP-compliant programming language that also supports the WS-Security standard. Integration Toolkits are available for .NET with WSE 3.0, Java, and with PHP. The Integration Toolkits include wrappers to simplify the calls to SOAP, example code, and documentation.

Included with the SDK are detailed integration guidelines and documentation, and fully functioning sample code. For simplified access, wrappers are provided for common technologies.

Streamlined Sales Tax Project (SSTP)

Organized in March 2000, the Streamlined Sales Tax Project (SSTP) objective is to simplify and modernize sales tax and use tax collection and administration in the United States. 

SpeedTax was certified as both a CSP (certified service provider) and CAS (certified automated solution) by the SST Governing Board in 2008.

The SSTP is setting up a system by which Internet e-commerce companies can voluntarily pay state taxes to the states in which their customers reside. The incentive the SSTP is offering companies is rather than try to work out how much tax a company owes for each locality they can instead use a CSP. In addition, "the states that are in compliance with SSUTA (Member States) will offer advantages to those sellers who use a CSP.” Today, twenty-two states have adopted the simplification measures in the Agreement (representing over 31 percent of the population) and more states are moving to adopt the simplification measure.

History

SpeedTax was founded by Anton Donde and Morris Karolicki in 2007 in Laguna Hills, California. During the product design phase, Karolicki and Donde took aim at the negative effects of sales tax complexity on business operations and growth.

SpeedTax Core Team:
 Anton Donde – CEO
 Morris Karolicki – CIO
 David Lahey – EVP
 Brian Austin – Director of Public Relations
 Diana DiBello – Director of Product Development
SpeedTax utilizes a VAR (value-added resellers) and CPA network to deliver its service to clients.

SpeedTax was acquired by CCH, a Wolters Kluwer business, on July 26, 2011.

References

 http://www.blytheco.com/mas90/speedtax.asp
 http://www.thetechgap.com/2008/09/speedtax-launch.html
 Reuters
 http://www.centredaily.com/business/technology/story/1077536.html
 http://www.kastechco.com/products/finance_operations.asp
 http://www.prweb.com/releases/sales_tax_management/software/prweb934024.htm
 http://www.cpatechnologyadvisor.com/web/online/Products/Streamlining-Sales-and-Use-Tax-Processes-Core-to-SpeedTax-System-/32$2064
 http://www.cpatechnologyadvisor.com/publication/article.jsp?pubId=1&id=2167&pageNum=5
 http://www.cpatechnologyadvisor.com/print/The-CPA-Technology-Advisor/Technology-is-for-Client-Service/1$2253
 http://www.cpatechnologyadvisor.com/print/The-CPA-Technology-Advisor/Good-Products-Make-Sales-Tax-Easier-/1$2024
 http://www.cpatechnologyadvisor.com/publication/article.jsp?pubId=1&id=2189&pageNum=3
 http://www.webcpa.com/article.cfm?articleid=30953&searchTerm=speedtax
 http://www.bmighty.com/ebusiness/showArticle.jhtml?articleID=214502171&pgno=3
 http://www.webcpa.com/article.cfm?articleid=30855&searchTerm=speedtax
 http://www.streamlinedsalestax.org/certified%20service%20provider.htm
 http://www.webcpa.com/article.cfm?articleid=30822&searchTerm=speedtax
 http://www.webcpa.com/article.cfm?articleid=30575&searchTerm=speedtax
 http://www.strikeiron.com/ProductDetail.aspx?p=468
 http://www.webcpa.com/article.cfm?articleid=30071&searchTerm=speedtax
 http://cloudcomputing.sys-con.com/node/872894
 http://www.webcpa.com/article.cfm?articleid=29763&searchTerm=speedtax&page=2
 http://www.webcpa.com/article.cfm?articleid=29666&searchTerm=speedtax
 Reuters
 http://www.webcpa.com/article.cfm?articleid=29720&searchTerm=speedtax
 http://www.webcpa.com/article.cfm?articleid=29309&searchTerm=speedtax
 http://cpatrendlines.com/2009/01/24/speedtax-rolls-out-reseller-program/
 http://www.webcpa.com/article.cfm?articleid=29072&searchTerm=speedtax
 http://www.webcpa.com/article.cfm?articleid=28802&searchTerm=speedtax
 http://msdynamicsworld.com/add-solution/e-commerce/speedtax-sales-tax-automation-and-management-software-developers-kit-e-comme
 http://www.webcpa.com/article.cfm?articleid=28770&searchTerm=speedtax
 Reuters
 http://www.webcpa.com/article.cfm?articleid=27995&searchTerm=speedtax

External links
 SpeedTax Website

Business software
Financial software
Defunct software companies of the United States